Marcin Sobczak (born June 20, 1987 in Jastrzębie Zdrój) is a Polish footballer currently playing for Zakynthos F.C. in Greek Third League.

External links 
 

1987 births
Living people
Polish footballers
Ruch Chorzów players
People from Jastrzębie-Zdrój
Sportspeople from Silesian Voivodeship
Association football forwards